Reinis Zālītis (19 September 1943 – 15 October 2005) was a Latvian football defender, famous for playing for Daugava Rīga.

Zālītis first began to play football in the sports school of Daugava Riga in the early 1950s. His first coach was the renowned in Latvia Maksis Leviatānuss. 1961 he played with the Latvia youth team, in 1962—with RVR Riga, in 1963—with RER Riga. Both of the latter seasons he was also a member of the reserves squad of Daugava Rīga, in 1964 became a full-time regular with Daugava and remained such until 1975 (with a break in 1974), capping more than 300 main squad appearances. From 1974 to 1976 he also was involved in coaching the Daugava squad. In later years he played with Torpedo Riga.

Because of his big height and good playing with the head Zālītis often played in the opponents penalty area for free kicks and corner kicks. With Daugava Zālītis made more than 300 main squad appearances until 1973.

References

1943 births
2005 deaths
Latvian footballers
Daugava Rīga players
Association football defenders